Marko Milič (born May 7, 1977) is a Slovenian basketball coach and former player. He represented the senior Slovenian national basketball team.

Playing career

Professional career
After being selected by the Philadelphia 76ers in the 1997 NBA draft (34th pick overall), Milič's rights were traded to the Phoenix Suns. After seeing limited NBA duty (44 career games) during his two seasons with the Suns, he returned to Europe and played for Union Olimpija (where he started playing senior basketball), Real Madrid (two stints), Fortitudo Bologna (Italian League runner-up), Pesaro (2004 Italian Cup finalist) and Virtus Bologna. He also represented Fenerbahçe in the first part of the 1998–99 season, due to the NBA season's lockout, returning to Phoenix in January 1999.

Milič won four Slovenian Leagues and four Slovenian Cups with Union Olimpija and led the team to its only EuroLeague Final Four appearance so far, in 1997. With Real Madrid he had his biggest success as a player with the ULEB Cup title of 2007 paired with a Spanish League title that same year. He also won the Kuwait League in 2014.

On October 14, 2015, he announced his retirement from playing professional basketball. On October 29, 2015, Union Olimpija retired Marko Milič's #12 jersey.

National team career
With the junior national teams of Slovenia, Milič played at the 1994 FIBA Europe Under-22 Championship and the 1996 FIBA Europe Under-22 Championship.

Milič played for the senior national basketball team of Slovenia, from 1995 until 2006. He played at the EuroBasket 1995, EuroBasket 1997, EuroBasket 1999, EuroBasket 2001, EuroBasket 2003, EuroBasket 2005 and 2006 FIBA World Championship.

Coaching career
In 2022, Milič was hired as an assistant coach with the Dallas Mavericks.

Personal life
Milič's father, Vladimir Milić, a Serb from Croatia based in Belgrade, was a shotputting champion in former Yugoslavia. His mother, Metka Papler, was also a successful sportswoman in Yugoslavia.

Club career statistics

EuroLeague

|-
| style="text-align:left;"|2000–01
| style="text-align:left;"|Real Madrid
| 15 || 8 || 22.5 || .519 || .300 || .556 || 4.6 || 1.9 || 1.8 || .0 || 9.3 || 10.9
|-
| style="text-align:left;"|2001–02
| style="text-align:left;"|Skipper Bologna
| 18 || 15 || 21.1 || .496 || .267 || .659 || 3.6 || 1.4 || 1.8 || .1 || 9.3 || 8.7
|-
| style="text-align:left;"|2004–05
| style="text-align:left;"|Scavolini Pesaro
| 22 || 19 || 26.1 || .489 || .250 || .617 || 4.6 || 2.2 || 1.6 || .0 || 10.4 || 11.2
|-
| style="text-align:left;"|2006–07
| style="text-align:left;" rowspan="3"|Union Olimpija
| 11 || 11 || 26.5 || .611 || .200 || .550 || 6.9 || 2.5 || 1.0 || .1 || 15.1 || 16.3
|-
| style="text-align:left;"|2007–08
| 14 || 14 || 30.3 || .517 || .125 || .744 || 6.4 || 1.5 || 1.2 || .1 || 15.6 || 15.8
|-
| style="text-align:left;"|2008–09
| 6 || 4 || 21.3 || .378 || .0 || .714 || 3.7 || 1.3 || 1.2 || .0 || 9.0 || 9.3
|-
| style="text-align:left;"|2009–10
| style="text-align:left;"|Entente Orléanaise
| 3 || 1 || 9.1 || 1.0 || .0 || .667 || 2.0 || .0 || .3 || .0 || 2.7 || 5.0
|- class="sortbottom"
| style="text-align:center;" colspan="2"|Career
| 89 || 72 || 25.5 || .513 || .239 || .628 || 4.8 || 1.8 || 1.5 || .0 || 11.0 || 11.7

NBA

Regular season

|-
| style="text-align:left;"|
| style="text-align:left;"|Phoenix
| 33 || 0 || 4.9 || .609 || .500 || .647 || .8 || .4 || .3 || .0 || 2.8
|-
| style="text-align:left;"|
| style="text-align:left;"|Phoenix
| 11 || 0 || 4.8 || .400 || .000 ||  || .5 || .2 || .3 || .1 || 1.5
|- class="sortbottom"
| style="text-align:center;" colspan="2"|Career
| 44 || 0 || 4.9 || .560 || .429 || .647 || .7 || .3 || .3 || .0 || 2.5

Playoffs

|-
| style="text-align:left;"|1998
| style="text-align:left;"|Phoenix
| 2 || 0 || 2.0 || .667 ||  ||  || .5 || .0 || .5 || .0 || 2.0
|- class="sortbottom"
| style="text-align:center;" colspan="2"|Career
| 2 || 0 || 2.0 || .667 ||  ||  || .5 || .0 || .5 || .0 || 2.0

References

External links
 
 Marko Milič at acb.com 
 Marko Milič at adriaticbasket.com
 Marko Milič at legabasket.it 
 Marko Milič at euroleague.net
 Marko Milič at tblstat.net

1977 births
Living people
2006 FIBA World Championship players
ABA League players
Fenerbahçe men's basketball players
Fortitudo Pallacanestro Bologna players
KK Olimpija players
Liga ACB players
Mahram Tehran BC players
National Basketball Association players from Slovenia
Orléans Loiret Basket players
Philadelphia 76ers draft picks
Phoenix Suns players
Power forwards (basketball)
Real Madrid Baloncesto players
Slovenian men's basketball players
Slovenian expatriate basketball people in Iran
Slovenian expatriate basketball people in Italy
Slovenian expatriate basketball people in Spain
Slovenian expatriate basketball people in Turkey
Slovenian expatriate basketball people in the United States
Slovenian people of Serbian descent
Small forwards
Sportspeople from Kranj
Vanoli Cremona players
Victoria Libertas Pallacanestro players
Virtus Bologna players